The following is a list of Grammy Awards winners and nominees from Austria:

Notes

References

Austrian
 Grammy
Grammy
Grammy